Magid may refer to:

 Magid (Jewish mysticism), in Kabbalah, a revelatory religious experience
 Maggid or Magid, traditional Jewish religious itinerant preacher in Judaism
 Magid Glove & Safety, an American PPE company
 Magid, a type of fictional magician in the novel Deep Secret by Diana Wynne Jones

Surname 
 Andy Magid (born 1944), American mathematician
 Barry Magid, American psychoanalyst
 Deborah Magid, American actor
 Frank Magid (1931-2010), American marketing consultant
 Jill Magid (born 1973), American conceptual artist
 Larry Magid (born 1947), American journalist and writer
 Lee Magid (1926-2007), American music producer
 Magid Magid (born 1989), British-Somali politician
 Shaul Magid, American rabbi and professor
 Sofia Magid (1894-1954), Soviet Jewish Folklorist
 Will Magid, known as Balkan Bump, American music producer

See also 
 Maggid (disambiguation)
 Majid (disambiguation)